Subliminal Seduction is a 1996 American drama science fiction film produced and directed by Andrew Stevens and starring Ian Ziering, Katherine Kelly Lang, Dee Wallace and Andrew Stevens. It was part of the Roger Corman Presents series premiering on August 3, 1996 at 10:15 PM, airing on Showtime as a television film.

Plot

Cast
Ian Ziering as Darrin Danver
Katherine Kelly Lang as Deb Danver
Andrew Stevens as Tom Moore
Dee Wallace Stone as Sissy Bonner
Stella Stevens as  Mrs. Beecham
Larry Manetti as Larry Bonner
Kim Morgan Greene as Meg
Kin Shriner as Jimmy
Marc Riffon as Doug
Rainer Grant as Angie
Griffin Drew as Kim

Release

Video distribution
The television film was subsequently distributed and marketed under multiple titles (Flash Frame, The Corporation and Mind Storm) as VHS, DVD and streaming video movies.

References

External links
Subliminal Seduction at TCMDB

Subliminal Seduction at Letterbox DVD

1996 films
1996 television films
Films produced by Roger Corman
American science fiction drama films
1990s science fiction drama films
1996 drama films
Films scored by Terry Plumeri
1990s English-language films
Films directed by Andrew Stevens
1990s American films